McGregor Mountain is a mountain located in the Catskill Mountains of New York south of Stamford. Utsayantha Mountain is located northwest of McGregor Mountain, Moresville Range is located southeast and Churchill Mountain is located west.

References

Mountains of Delaware County, New York
Mountains of New York (state)